Skelton-in-Cleveland or Skelton is a market town in the civil parish of Skelton and Brotton at the foot of the Cleveland Hills and about  east of Middlesbrough centre. It is in the borough of Redcar and Cleveland, North Yorkshire, England.

The first real mention of Skelton is in the Domesday Book of 1086, which details taxes collected. Skelton Castle was built in the 12th century by the 
de Brus (Bruce) family. It is a town by market charter.

Skelton is made up of villages; including North Skelton, Skelton Green, and New Skelton. Population of the Skelton Built-up area was 6,535, at the 2011 census.

All Saints' Churches

Old All Saints' Church is a redundant Church of England church, built in Georgian times; it is set in parkland with views to the 18th-century Gothic-style country house called Skelton Castle. Graves can be seen in the churchyard with skull-and-crossbones motifs. The church was mostly rebuilt in 1785, on a site where two previous churches had been built.

The pulpit, the box pews and other furnishings, date from the rebuilding, with slightly earlier text boards and some older monuments on a remaining medieval wall. The outside stonework shows a herringbone tooling in keeping with local styles, in contrast to the 'Venetian' east window and the dark pink colouring of the interior.

A new All Saints' church was built on the other side of the high street, in 1884, by R.J. Johnston of Newcastle. It is in the decorated style and of dressed sandstone with ashlar, with plain clay tiled roofs.

After the new church was built, the Georgian church fell into disrepair, declared redundant and is now maintained by the Churches Conservation Trust. Both churches are Grade II listed buildings.

Education  
The only school in the town is Skelton Primary School which takes on students age 3–11.

Sport
The town has a cricket club, Skelton Castle Cricket Club, who play in the Langbaurgh cricket league. Their grounds, Old Dog Kennels; is accessible via the A174. Skelton United is the town's football club, with junior teams from U7s to U16s.

Local amenities

Skelton's high street hosts various small independent/chain shops, a Cooplands and Co-operative Food store. There are several public houses throughout Skelton and on the edge of town there is a retail estate with a large Asda, Aldi & B&M supermarkets as well as a Harvester Pub, a Greggs bakery and a McDonalds drive through.

Famous son 
Skelton-in-Cleveland was the birthplace, in 1873, of Frank Wild, polar explorer and Ernest Shackleton's right-hand man. In 2016 a statue of Wild was erected in Skelton-in-Cleveland.

Gallery

References

 
Towns in North Yorkshire
Places in the Tees Valley
Redcar and Cleveland